Alexander Throm (born 8 September 1968) is a German lawyer and politician of the Christian Democratic Union (CDU) who has been serving as a member of the Bundestag from the state of Baden-Württemberg since 2017. In 2001, he co-founded a law firm with Thomas Strobl.

Political career 
From 2011 until 2016, Throm was a member of the State Parliament of Baden-Württemberg, where he served on the Committee on Internal Affairs and the Committee on European Affairs.

Throm became a member of the Bundestag after the 2017 German federal election, representing Heilbronn. He is a member of the Committee on Internal Affairs, the Committee on the Verification of Credentials and Immunities and the Committee on Rules of Procedure (since 2019). In this capacity, he serves as his parliamentary group’s rapporteur on the Residence Act (AufenthG).

Other activities 
 Südwestdeutsche Salzwerke AG (SWS AG), Member of the Supervisory Board (until 2019)

Political positions 
Ahead of the 2021 national elections, Throm endorsed Markus Söder as the Christian Democrats' joint candidate to succeed Chancellor Angela Merkel.

References

External links 

  
 Bundestag biography 

1968 births
Living people
Members of the Bundestag for Baden-Württemberg
Members of the Bundestag 2021–2025
Members of the Bundestag 2017–2021
Members of the Bundestag for the Christian Democratic Union of Germany